The College Widow is a 1927 American silent comedy film produced and distributed by Warner Bros. and directed by Archie Mayo. The film is based on the 1904 Broadway play of the same name by George Ade and was previously adapted to film in 1915 with Ethel Clayton. The 1927 silent film version is a starring vehicle for Dolores Costello.

The story was also filmed in 1930 as an early talkie, Maybe It's Love, starring Joan Bennett and in 1936 as Freshman Love with Patricia Ellis.

Cast
Dolores Costello as Jane Witherspoon
William Collier, Jr. as Billy Bolton
Douglas Gerrard as Professor Jelicoe
Anders Randolf as Hiram Bolton
Charles Hills Mailes as Professor Witherspoon
Robert Ryan as Jack Larrbee
Sumner Getchell as Jimmie Hopper
Guinn 'Big Boy' Williams as Don White
Grace Gordon as Flora

Box Office
According to Warner Bros. records, the film earned $268,000 domestically and $75,000 foreign.

Preservation status
This motion picture is now considered to be a lost film.

See also
List of lost films
List of early Warner Bros. sound and talking features

References

External links

Lobby poster

1927 films
1927 romantic comedy films
American romantic comedy films
American silent feature films
American films based on plays
Films directed by Archie Mayo
Warner Bros. films
American football films
American black-and-white films
Transitional sound comedy films
Lost American films
1927 lost films
1920s American films
Silent romantic comedy films
Silent American comedy films